The following lists events that happened during 1965 in the Dominican Republic.

Incumbents
President: 
 until 25 April: Triumvirate   
 25 April: Revolutionary Committee
 25–27 April: José Rafael Molina Ureña  
 27 April–4 May: Vacant 
 1–7 May: Military Junta
 7 May–30 August: Government of National Reconstruction 
 30 August–3 September:  Vacant
 4 May–3 September: Francisco Caamaño 
 starting 3 September: Héctor García-Godoy
Vice President: 
 until 25 April: Triumvirate
 May–3 September: Vacant
 starting 3 September: Manuel Joaquín Castillo

Events
April 24 - officers and civilians loyal to deposed President Juan Bosch mutiny against the right-wing junta running the country, setting up a provisional government.
April 28 - Forces loyal to the deposed military-imposed government stage a countercoup, supported by U.S. troops sent by President Lyndon B. Johnson, "for the stated purpose of protecting U.S. citizens and preventing an alleged Communist takeover of the country", thus thwarting the possibility of "another Cuba".

Births

 
1960s in the Dominican Republic
Years of the 20th century in the Dominican Republic
Dominican Republic
Dominican Republic